Lars Granaas (born 12 April 1979) is a Norwegian former professional footballer who played as a defender or midfielder for Mjøndalen IF.

Career
Granaas debuted for Strømsgodset IF in 1997 as a promising young player, in November 1997, he had a trial at Manchester United. Since 1999 he was a first team regular, and he played a total of 214 matches and scored 16 goals for Strømsgodset. In 2006, his playing time with the first team was limited and he left Strømsgodset for Follo on 28 June 2006. In summer 2007 he returned from an injury to his hip bone. He signed for Mjøndalen IF after the 2008 season, which had been promoted to Adeccoligaen.

Granaas played 28 international matches for Norway on youth level, including nine matches for Norway U21.

Career statistics

References

External links
 Profile at fotball.no
 Lars Granaas profile at altomfotball.no
 

1979 births
Living people
Norwegian footballers
Association football defenders
Association football midfielders
Strømsgodset Toppfotball players
Follo FK players
Mjøndalen IF players